Ravenna is a city in Italy.

Ravenna may also refer to:

People
 John of Ravenna (disambiguation)
 Juti Ravenna (1897–1972), Italian painter
 Pia Ravenna (1894–1964), Finnish coloratura soprano
 Pierfelice Ravenna (born 1938), Chilean botanist

Places
 Ravenna, Ontario, a community in The Blue Mountains, Canada
 Ravenna Gorge, a side valley of Hell Valley (Hoellental) in the Black Forest, Germany
 Province of Ravenna, Italy

United States
Ravenna, Kentucky
Ravenna, Michigan
Ravenna (Natchez, Mississippi), listed on the National Register of Historic Places
Ravenna, Nebraska
Ravenna, Ohio
Ravenna, Texas
Ravenna, Seattle, Washington
Ravenna Township (disambiguation)

Other uses
 Ravenna (album), the first studio album by alternative rock band The Reason
 Ravenna (butterfly), a genus of butterflies in the tribe Theclini of the family Lycaenidae
 Ravenna (networking), a media over IP networking technology
 Ravenna F.C. Italian football club based in Ravenna, Italy
 Ravenna Creek, a stream in Seattle, Washington
 Ravenna Cosmography, a 7th-century map of the known world
 Ravenna Training and Logistics Site or Ravenna Arsenal, a military base near Ravenna, Ohio
 3rd Infantry Division "Ravenna", an Italian division of World War II
 "Ravenna", an 1878 poem by Oscar Wilde

See also
 Battle of Ravenna (disambiguation), a list of battles occurring near the city
 Ravena, New York, a village in Albany County
 Ravana, a person in the Hindu epic Ramayana
 Ravonna, a character in the Marvel Comics